William Betts (26 March 1864 – 8 August 1941) was an English footballer who played for The Wednesday, as well as the English national side. Betts played as a centre-half and made a total of 143 appearances in two spells for The Wednesday, scoring four goals.

References

External links

Player profile at the FA.com
Player profile at the Sheffield Wednesday Archive

1864 births
1941 deaths
Footballers from Sheffield
English footballers
England international footballers
Association football defenders
Pyebank F.C. players
Heeley F.C. players
Sheffield Wednesday F.C. players
Lockwood Brothers F.C. players
English Football League players
FA Cup Final players